The Micronauts are a Paris-based dance music act.  They formed when Christophe Monier met Canada-born George Issakidis whilst working at the Parisian music fanzine eDEN.

The first release was a 12 inch called "The Jazz."  They continued to work throughout the 1990s, developing an acid techno style of their own.  This attracted the attention of high-profile artists, such as The Chemical Brothers and Underworld.  Indeed, their remix of Block Rockin' Beats appears on The Chemical Brothers' DJ mix album Brothers Gonna Work It Out and their remix of Underworld's Bruce Lee was also widely distributed.

At the end of the decade they were signed to the Astralwerks label and soon after released The Jag.  One year later, in 2000, they released their debut EP, Bleep to Bleep.  However, soon after this, Issakidis left the project.

Monier continues to record and work under the name. He notably remixed Mirwais' "Miss You" and Madonna's "Hollywood" in 2003. He set up the Micronautics label in 2004. On 28 September 2007 he released a new album, Damaging Consent with a bonus ten track remixes retrospective.

In 2018, Christophe Monier took over the project The Micronauts after eleven years of silence. In June, he released the EP Acid Party then the album Head Control Body Control in December on his Micronautics label.

Selected discography

Studio albums 

 Bleep To Bleep [2000]
 Head Control Body Control [2018]

EPs 

 I Wanna Be Your Toy - I Wanna Be Yours (Pt. 1) / (Pt.2) / (Pt.3) / I Wanna Be Your Toy / High Rye [2004]
 Anarchie - High Rise / Get Down / Sinecitta [2004]
 Sweat - Sweat / Cinecitta Minimale / Cinecitta / Sweat Relax Instru [2005]
 Off The Beaten Track - The Beat / Sweet / Beaten [2006]
 Damaging Consent EP - Reaction / Distracted / Underworld - Bruce Lee (The Micronauts Remix) [2007]

Singles 

 "Get Funky Get Down" [1995]
 "The Jazz" / "The Jam" [1995]
 "The Jag" [1996]
 "Baby Wants To Rock" [2000]
 "Hoochie Coochie" [2012]
 "Acid Party" [2018]

References

External links

 The Micronauts on Discogs

 Official website

Techno music groups